Thomas Busby (1735 22 October 1798) was a soldier and innkeeper from Ireland.

Busby was with the 27th Regiment of Foot during the Seven Years' War in Canada. A planned action against the French fortress at Louisbourg, Nova Scotia was canceled. Busby saw much action with James Abercrombie's first attack on Fort Carillon on Lake Champlain, and, in 1759, participated in the capture of Carillon and Fort Saint Frédéric (also on Lake Champlain at modern day Crown Point, New York).

His son, also named Thomas Busby, was a member of the Lower Canada legislature and served as business agent for the barons of Longueuil.

References 
 

1735 births
1798 deaths
27th Regiment of Foot officers
18th-century Irish people
Irish officers in the British Army
Canadian people of Irish descent